Mere Khwab Lauta Do is a 2014 Pakistani television drama serial, directed by Hisham Syed. It is produced by Aijaz Aslam. The serial stars Saima Azhar and Aijaz Aslam in lead roles.

The serial marks debut of model Saima Azhar.

Plot
"Mere Khwab Lauta Do" is story of Kanwal, who wants to marry love of her life but her family pressurize her to marry someone else. However, she manages to get hitched with her love but she realizes that life is not going to be easy for her.

Cast
Saima Azhar as Kanwal
Aijaz Aslam as Imran
Gul-e-Rana as Nudrat- Kanwal's mother
Adnan Shah Tipu as Faisal - Kanwal's brother
Sumaiya Malik as Noor - Faisal's wife
Saba Faisal - Imran, Chanda and Sitara's mother
Najiba Faiz as Chanda - Imran's youngest sister
Tipu Sharif as Salman - Imran's brother-in-law, Sitara's husband
Yasir Mazhar as Shoaib - Kanwal's love interest and her cousin
Mahira Abbasi as Sitara - Imran's younger sister
Sadia Faisal as Asma - Kanwal's cousin, Shoaib's sister
Humaira Zahid as Najma - Kanwal's phuppo, Asma and Shoaib's mother

References

External links 
 

Pakistani drama television series
2014 Pakistani television series debuts
2015 Pakistani television series endings
Urdu-language television shows
ARY Zindagi original programming